Marangaroo is a suburb of Perth, Western Australia.  It is located approximately 18 km north of Perth City, within the City of Wanneroo. Marangaroo's borders comprise Wanneroo Road, Hepburn Avenue, Mirrabooka Avenue and Marangaroo Drive. 

Marangaroo means place of blue flowers in the local aboriginal language. It is home to the Marangaroo Golf Course  and two primary schools - Marangaroo Primary School which was established in 1987 and Rawlinson Primary School which was established in 2003.

Paralympic athlete Sarah Edmiston is from Marangaroo.

References 

Suburbs of Perth, Western Australia
Suburbs of the City of Wanneroo